The 2019 Il Lombardia was a road cycling one-day race that took place on 12 October 2019 in Italy. It was the 113th edition of Il Lombardia and the 37th event of the 2019 UCI World Tour. Bauke Mollema of  became the first Dutch winner of Il Lombardia since Hennie Kuiper's victory in 1981. Also, for the first time since 1990, there were no Italian riders in the top 10.

Teams
Twenty-five teams, consisting of all 18 UCI WorldTour teams and 7 UCI Professional Continental teams, of seven riders participated in the race. Of the 175 riders that started the race, 109 riders finished.

UCI WorldTeams

 
 
 
 
 
 
 
 
 
 
 
 
 
 
 
 
 
 

UCI Professional Continental teams

Results

References

Il Lombardia
Il Lombardia
Il Lombardia
Giro di Lombardia